The 2016 Philippine Basketball Association (PBA) Commissioner's Cup, also known as the 2016 Oppo-PBA Commissioner's Cup for sponsorship reasons, was the second conference of the 2015–16 PBA season. The tournament allowed teams to hire foreign players or imports with a height limit of 6'9" for the top eight teams of the 2015–16 PBA Philippine Cup, while the bottom four teams were allowed to hire imports with no height limit.

Format
Due to the preparations of the Philippines men's national basketball team for the upcoming 2016 FIBA World Olympic Qualifying Tournament, the opening of Governors' Cup was moved at the conclusion of the FIBA tournament.

The following format was observed for the duration of the conference: 
 Single-round robin eliminations; 11 games per team; Teams are then seeded by basis on win–loss records.
Top eight teams will advance to the quarterfinals. In case of tie, playoff games will be held only for the #2 and #8 seeds.
Quarterfinals:
QF1: #1 vs #8 (#1 twice-to-beat)
QF2: #2 vs #7 (#2 twice-to-beat)
QF3: #3 vs #6 (best-of-3 series)
QF4: #4 vs #5 (best-of-3 series)
Semifinals (best-of-5 series):
SF1: QF1 Winner vs. QF4 Winner
SF2: QF2 Winner vs. QF3 Winner
Finals (best-of-7 series)
F1: SF1 Winner vs SF2 Winner

Elimination round

Team standings

Schedule

Results

Bracket

Quarterfinals

(1) San Miguel vs. (8) Star

(2) Meralco vs. (7) NLEX

(3) Alaska vs. (6) TNT

(4) Barangay Ginebra vs. (5) Rain or Shine

Semifinals

(1) San Miguel vs. (5) Rain or Shine

(2) Meralco vs. (3) Alaska

Finals

Imports 
The following is the list of imports, which had played for their respective teams at least once, with the returning imports in italics. Highlighted are the imports who stayed with their respective teams for the whole conference.

Import handicapping

Awards

Conference
Best Player of the Conference: Calvin Abueva 
Bobby Parks Best Import of the Conference: Arinze Onuaku 
Finals MVP: Paul Lee

Players of the Week

References

External links
 PBA.ph

PBA Commissioner's Cup
Commissioner's Cup